Annals of Telecommunications is a peer-reviewed scientific journal published by Springer Science+Business Media and edited by Télécom Paris. Printed every two months, it covers a broad spectrum related to the field of modern telecommunications, focusing on five areas from the communication networks and the transmission technologies to the uses and services. The editor-in-chief is Guy Pujolle (Pierre and Marie Curie University). The journal is abstracted and indexed in Scopus and the Science Citation Index Expanded. According to the Journal Citation Reports, the journal has a 2020 impact factor of 1.444.

References

External links 

 

Bimonthly journals
Publications established in 1946
Springer Science+Business Media academic journals
English-language journals
Hybrid open access journals